Zhaoyang District is the only district and the seat of the city of Zhaotong, in the northeast of Yunnan Province, China. It borders the provinces of Guizhou to the southeast and Sichuan to the west.

Administrative divisions
Zhaoyang County has 3 subdistricts, 10 towns, 3 townships and 4 ethnic townships. 
3 subdistricts

 Fenghuang
 Longquan
 Miaoba
10 towns

3 townships

 Sujia
 Dazhaizi
 Tianba
4 ethnic townships

References

External links
Zhaoyang District Official Website 

County-level divisions of Zhaotong
Districts of China